Seven teams contested in the 2010 AFC Champions League qualifying play-off. The two winners advanced to the 2010 AFC Champions League group stage. The losers entered the 2010 AFC Cup group stage.

Bracket

East Asia

West Asia

Matches

East Asia

Semi-final Round

Final Round

West Asia

Semi-final Round

Final Round

External links
AFC Champions League Official Page 

Qualifying Play-off